The ADM Capital Foundation (ADMCF) is an impact-driven philanthropic foundation established in 2006 by investment manager ADM Capital. It works to address environmental and social challenges across Asia. It is a 501(c) (3) organization in the USA and has been granted tax exempt status under Section 88 of the Hong Kong Government Inland Revenue Ordinance.

Background

History
In 2006, ADM Capital was approached by M’Lop Tapang, a Cambodian organization working with children, to help secure funding for a permanent day centre. This became a first project for the foundation, which purchased land in Sihanoukville and built the day centre for M'Lop Tapang. This was also established to help poverty challenged children access health care and school. Other impact-driven environmental programs followed. Climate and biodiversity are umbrella themes for AMCF.

Focus Areas

ADMCF responds to the environmental challenges stemming from two decades of Asian growth and works towards solutions across key areas: 
 marine ecology
 water security
 air quality
 wildlife crime
 finance for nature

ADMCF has a legacy program that works with children at risk.

The Approach

ADMCF initiates and incubates initiatives to fill gaps where challenges are not being addressed or a new approach to solutions is needed. It serves as a convener of organizations that have a common agenda within the key program areas. The team also helps organizations strengthen their organizational capacity and expand their networks. It promotes alliances among not-for-profits, universities and government to make sure funding is used appropriately and to minimise waste. All of ADMCF's work is underpinned by research and data to identify challenges and come up with solutions. ADMCF aggregates funding looking to make strategic philanthropic investment.

Initiatives
 Aarambh India, an initiative the works on sexual offenses against children in India.
 China Water Risk, an initiative that addresses business and environmental risks around China's water issues.
 Support HK, Hong Kong's first environmental petition platform
 Choose Right Today, an initiative that works on sustainable seafood in Hong Kong
 Redress, an environmental NGO working to reduce waste in the fashion industry
 Hong Kong Wildlife Trade Working Group, a group of international and local NGOs, as well as experts that works against wildlife trafficking 
Eat Without Waste, confronting Hong Kong's takeout container waste challenge

Tropical Landscapes Finance Facility
ADMCF is a partner with ADM Capital, UN Environment, ICRAF and BNP Paribas in creating the Tropical Landscapes Finance Facility for Indonesia. The Tropical Landscapes Finance Facility is a loan fund and a grant fund that aims to support projects and companies in Indonesia that stimulate green growth and rural jobs. It won the 2018 Triple A Asset Award in the category of "Sustainable Finance."

References

External links
 

Conservation and environmental foundations
Environmental charities
Environmental organisations based in Hong Kong
Foundations based in Hong Kong
Charities based in Hong Kong
Organizations established in 2006